Belarusian Bandy Federation is the governing body for bandy in Belarus. Its headquarters is in Minsk. Belarusian Bandy Federation became a member of Federation of International Bandy in 1999. In 2016 it was working towards creating a professional team that would play in the Russian Bandy Super League, with home matches in Minsk-Arena.

National team

References

Bandy in Belarus
Bandy governing bodies
Bandy
Federation of International Bandy members